Do Chahi or Dochahi (meaning "two wells") may refer to:
 Dochahi, Kerman
 Do Chahi, Rashtkhvar, in Razavi Khorasan Province
 Do Chahi-ye Bala, in Razavi Khorasan Province
 Do Chahi, Sabzevar, in Razavi Khorasan Province
 Do Chahi, South Khorasan